The 2016–17 season was the 118th in Athletic Club’s history and the 86th in the top tier.

Squad
According to the official website.

Player statistics

Disciplinary record
Iker Muniain's yellow card against Osasuna on matchday 10 was taken back in December 2016.

From the youth system

Transfer
In

Out

Staff
According to the official website.

Pre-season and friendlies

Competitions

Overview

La Liga

League table

Results summary

Round by round

Matches

Copa del Rey

Round of 32

Round of 16

UEFA Europa League

Group stage

Knockout phase

Round of 32

References

Athletic Bilbao seasons
Athletic Bilbao
Athletic Bilbao